The 1957 Farsinaj earthquake struck Hamadan, Iran on 13 December at 05:15 local time. The moment magnitude 6.5 earthquake destroyed 211 villages, killed approximately 1,130 people, and left another 900 injured.

Tectonic setting

The Zagros Mountains stretching from Turkey to the Gulf of Oman, through Iran and Iraq for  formed from continental collision involving the Arabian Plate and Central Iran. Its formation occurred during the late-Triassic, late-Jurassic, late-Cretaceous, Oligocene and Pliocene. During its early formation, some extensional tectonics is believed to have occurred. The mountain range is still accommodating deformation, evident in the present-day seismicity. Deformation is accommodated by thrust and strike-slip faulting within the range. Parallel to major thrust faults of the mountains is the Main Recent Fault, an active right-lateral strike-slip fault. Convergence between the Arabian Plate and Iran occurs obliquely along the Zagros Mountains—approximately 30–50 percent of the ~/yr convergence between the two plates is accommodated here.

Earthquake
Three historical earthquakes were documented near the Main Recent Fault. Two earthquakes in May 912 and April 1008 occurred near the former settlement of Dinavar while a third occurred to the southeast of Dorud before 1889. The first two earthquakes brought heavy damage and casualties in Dinawar. Historic records of the 912 earthquake says a "mountain split open" and water gushed out, sinking many settlements. Ground cracks, possibly associated with tectonic origins was documented during the 1008 event.

Seismicity along the Main Recent Fault was nearly absent for nearly 50 years since 1909. In December 1955, an earthquake near Razan caused rockfalls and three deaths. A single foreshock was felt 26 hours before the mainshock. The mainshock was followed by 32 aftershocks within a month of its occurrence. Its epicenters were instrumentally recorded and located, revealing a northeast—southwest trend intersecting the Main Recent Fault (also perpenticular to the axis of meizoseismal area). Ground deformations including rockfalls and fractures occurred, associated with the mainshock and aftershocks, but there was inconclusive evidence to show that these were of tectonic origin.

Damage and casualties
A site investigation by Nicholas Ambraseys and other researchers revealed serious damage over a  area. Damage was greatest in the northeast than southwest due to the direction that seismic energy radiated. At least 1,130 people died, 900 were injured, and 15,000 became homeless—at least 20,000 animals also died.

The mainshock and its aftershocks heavily damaged or destroyed 5,000 of the 9,000 homes in the area. Most homes were constructed of single-storey adobe or rubble masonry materials held together by mud, and heavy roofs from tampered earth. Some villages had double-storey adobe and single-storey brick homes with jack arches or iron sheets.

In the epicenter area, the seismic intensity was considered modest, assigned VII+ on the Modified Mercalli intensity scale. The area of maximum damage was between Kangavar and Farsinaj, and the most affected areas were north of Sahneh. The severity of damage became inconsistent and repidly fell to the south. No serious damage occurred outside the  radius around Farsinaj, and at Sonqor, only cracks appeared in buildings. At Sarab, the village was heavily damaged and 53 residents died, whereas at Sahneh, Gakul and Bisitun, damage was moderate. Northwest of Sahneh the mainshock produced cracks in the ground. Rockfalls and disruption of a natural spring was also recorded.

At Farsinaj, 703 people, or about half the population, perished, and only 30 homes were left intact. At Dehasiyab, 34 people died and 23 were injured—the village was razed and reconstructed several hundred meters away. Six people died, 20 were injured and two-thirds of homes in Sollantaher were destroyed. In two villages north of Farsinaj, the death toll totaled 63.

Aftershocks on 13 and 18 December near Kangavar and Firuzabad on 28 December caused further damage. The aftershock on 14 December caused more than 20 deaths and left 50 injured. Another aftershock on the same day at Najafabad killed one and injured four, and destroyed more buildings. Fourteen people died in an aftershock on 18 December at Fash. An additional 20 people and more animals died from a snow storm on 21 December. On 31 December, another aftershock killed three at Kangavar.

See also
 List of earthquakes in 1957
 List of earthquakes in Iran

References

1957 earthquakes
Earthquakes in Iran
1957 in Iran
December 1957 events in Asia
History of Hamadan Province